Nick Bradley-Qalilawa (born 28 March 1980) is a former Fiji international rugby league footballer who played in the 2000s.

Background
Bradley-Qalilawa was born in Darlinghurst, New South Wales, Australia.

Career in Australia
Bradley-Qalilawa is a North Sydney Bears junior playing every grade in the district except first-grade and won a Jersey Flegg Grand final in 1998. He played at the Wests Tigers, making his first grade début in 2001, Manly and London Broncos/Harlequins RL. He primarily played on the wing.

Career in the Super League

Bradley-Qalilawa joined the London Broncos in 2005 and played for the club under its new guise as Harlequins RL in 2006. He left the club at the conclusion of 2006's Super League XI, scoring 26 tries in 55 games.

Representative career
He was named in the Fiji squad for the 2008 Rugby League World Cup.

References

External links
rleague.com - Bradley-Qalilawa, Nick
Harlequins Rugby League profile
 NRL profile
 Manly profile

1980 births
Australian rugby league players
Australian people of I-Taukei Fijian descent
Fiji national rugby league team players
Wests Tigers players
Manly Warringah Sea Eagles players
London Broncos players
Rugby league wingers
Rugby league centres
Living people
Rugby league players from Sydney